

Bakota Bay is a bay located on the Dniester River that was formed after the  construction of the Dniester Hydro Power Station. The bay is part of the Podilski Tovtry National Nature Park.

Overview
Located in a river canyon, the ecological environment is typical of that of the of upper Dniester basin. The bay plays an important role in the conservation of a number of rare species of Ukrainian plants and animals:

 species of birds
 first of all predatory (Northern goshawk, Accipiter gentilis; Eurasian sparrowhawk, Accipiter nisus; Common buzzard, Buteo buteo; Short-toed snake eagle, Circaetus gallicus; Common kestrel, Falco tinnunculus), 
 of extended stay during spring and autumn migrations birds of the wetland habitat (Mallard, Anas platyrhynchos; Mute swan, Cygnus olor; Great egret, Egretta alba; Little egret, Egretta garzetta; Wood sandpiper, Tringa glareola; Northern lapwing, Vanellus vanellus; others)
 spawning of fish.

Physical and biogeographical characteristics
Bakota Bay is a designated continental biogeographical region within the European Emerald network. It is categorized as belonging to the East European province of the European broadleaf area, and belongs to the mid-portion of the Dniester basin (upstream of Dniester Reservoir).

Wetland physical features
The bay is located within the Volhynian-Podolian tectonic block. The geology of the bay is characterized by limestone, marls, sandstones, shales, as well as granites and gneisses that are overlaid with loesses. The surrounding area forms part of a gentle rolling loess plain. The area belongs to the West-Podolian region of West Podolian Province of the Podolian Forest-steppe zone. Soils are dark grey podzol, chernozems podzol, predominantly on loess rocks.

The bay was created in 1976 following the creation of the Dniester Reservoir on the Dniester River. The water, which is of good qualityis used to supply Kamianets-Podilskyi.

See also
 Bakota, Ukraine

References

External links
 Bakota Bay at the Biomon Wetlands
 Bakota Bay. Igotoworld.
 View of the bay.

Bays of Ukraine
Dniester
Ramsar sites in Ukraine